Michael Simons (born September 8, 1989) is a former American football offensive lineman. He played college football at Central Connecticut State University and attended South Broward High School in Hollywood, Florida and Wilbraham & Monson Academy in Wilbraham, Massachusetts. He was a member of the Orlando Predators, Arizona Rattlers, and Philadelphia Soul.

College career
Simon played for the Central Connecticut from 2008 to 2009. He played in 3 games during his career, including 1 start at guard. Following his sophomore year, Simons quit football.

Professional career

Lehigh Valley Steelhawks
After a four-year break from football, Simons played for the Lehigh Valley Steelhawks of the Professional Indoor Football League in 2013.

Orlando Predators
On August 1, 2013, Simons was assigned to the Orlando Predators of the Arena Football League He was assigned as an offensive lineman for the Predators, but his 4.9 second 40-yard dash time at the Predators tryout made him an option for use at fullback. Simons ran for 64 yards on 25 carries for 6 touchdowns as a rookie. On September 24, 2014, Simons had his rookie option exercised by the Predators. In his second season with the Predators, Simons ran for 165 yards and scored 13 touchdowns.

Arizona Rattlers
On December 9, 2015, Simons was assigned to the Arizona Rattlers. Simons was relieved of his fullback duties in Arizona, but he did catch 5 passes for 60 yards with 2 touchdowns.

Philadelphia Soul
Simons was assigned to the Philadelphia Soul for the 2017 season. On August 26, 2017, the Soul beat the Tampa Bay Storm in ArenaBowl XXX by a score of 44–40.

References

External links
Central Connecticut Blue Devils profile

Living people
1989 births
Players of American football from Florida
American football offensive linemen
Central Connecticut Blue Devils football players
Lehigh Valley Steelhawks players
Orlando Predators players
Arizona Rattlers players
Philadelphia Soul players
Sportspeople from Hollywood, Florida